Mitchell Creek (born 27 April 1992) is an Australian professional basketball player for Mets de Guaynabo of the Baloncesto Superior Nacional. He is also contracted with the South East Melbourne Phoenix of the National Basketball League (NBL). He began his NBL career in 2010 and played his first eight seasons with the Adelaide 36ers. After a stint in Germany in 2018, he joined the Long Island Nets of the NBA G League. During the 2018–19 season, he had stints in the National Basketball Association (NBA) with the Brooklyn Nets and Minnesota Timberwolves. He joined the Phoenix in 2019.

Early life and career
Creek was born and raised in Horsham in country Victoria. He attended St Brigid's College, where he earned induction into the school's hall of fame.

In 2009, Creek played a leading role in Victoria Country's campaign at the Under-18 National Championships, trained with the Australian under-19 squad, and earned a place at the prestigious Nike All-Asia Camp in Beijing, China. In June, he received a scholarship to the Australian Institute of Sport (AIS) men's basketball program in Canberra. Between 2007 and 2009, Creek played 21 games for the Horsham Hornets in the Big V. To conclude 2009, he played one game for the AIS in the SEABL, before playing 14 games in the SEABL for the AIS in 2010.

In addition to playing for the AIS in 2010, Creek also guided Victoria Country to a gold medal at the Under-20 National Championships, and had a fairytale international debut, leading the Australian under-19 team to its first gold medal at the Albert Schweitzer Tournament in Mannheim, Germany. Creek was subsequently crowned the tournament's most valuable player after averaging 17 points per game and finishing second in efficiency on plus 20.

In 2011, Creek helped Victoria Country win back-to-back gold medals at the Under-20 National Championships, as they were victorious in defeating Queensland in the final, winning 77–70. He subsequently won the Bob Staunton Award for tournament MVP after averaging 19 points, 7.6 rebounds and 3 assists per game.

Professional career

Adelaide 36ers (2010–2018)
Creek joined the Adelaide 36ers for the 2010–11 NBL season. He made his NBL debut on 3 December 2010, recording seven points and three steals in 21 minutes off the bench in a 92–79 win over the Townsville Crocodiles. In 20 games as a rookie, Creek averaged 5.8 points and 2.4 rebounds per game. He remained in Adelaide following his rookie season and played for the South Adelaide Panthers of the Central ABL. In 2011–12, Creek appeared in all 28 games for the 36ers, averaging 5.4 points, 3.0 rebounds and 1.2 assists per game. He again played in the Central ABL during the 2012 off-season, appearing in five games for the Woodville Warriors.

Creek's 2012–13 season was cut short after rupturing his Achilles tendon on 15 December against the Crocodiles in Adelaide. In 12 games, he averaged 5.8 points and 2.6 rebounds per game. He returned to action in 2013–14, helping the 36ers reach the NBL Grand Final, where they lost to the Perth Wildcats in three games. In 33 games, Creek averaged 7.7 points, 3.8 rebounds and 1.0 assists per game. During the 2014 off-season, Creek played in the SEABL for the Nunawading Spectres.

Creek had a career-best season in 2014–15, averaging 11.2 points, 4.4 rebounds and 1.5 assists in 26 games. During the 2015 off-season, he played for the Woodville Warriors. In 2015–16, Creek averaged 9.9 points, 4.1 rebounds, 1.4 assists and 1.1 steals in 26 games for the 36ers.

During the 2016 off-season, Creek helped the Southern Tigers win the Premier League championship. He was named Grand Final MVP after recording 29 points, 14 rebounds, five assists, two steals and three blocks in an 85–66 win over the Sturt Sabres. He was also named league MVP, Defensive Player of the Year and earned All-Star Five honours.

After signing a three-year contract extension with the 36ers in May 2016, Creek was named team captain for the 2016–17 season. On 16 October, he was ruled out for eight weeks after sustaining a stress fracture in his right foot against Melbourne United two days earlier. Creek returned to action on 10 December, scoring 14 points off the bench in a 102–92 win over the New Zealand Breakers. Creek went on to help the 36ers win the minor premiership with a 17–11 record. In 21 games, he averaged 12.1 points, 5.4 rebounds, 1.9 assists and 1.0 steals per game. Despite suffering a broken hand following the 2016–17 season, Creek was invited to participate in a free agent mini-camp run by the Utah Jazz before joining the Jazz's Summer League team.

In 2017–18, despite missing three weeks with a hamstring injury, Creek was named the NBL Fans MVP and earned All-NBL Second Team honours. Creek helped the 36ers reach the 2018 NBL Grand Final series, where they were defeated 3–2 by Melbourne United. He averaged 14.8 points, 6.0 rebounds, and 2.6 assists in what was a career-best season.

Europe, NBA G League and NBA (2018–2019)
Creek finished the 2017–18 German Basketball Bundesliga season with BG Göttingen. In seven games, he averaged 11.9 points, 2.7 rebounds and 1.3 assists per game.

After initially signing with s.Oliver Würzburg for the 2018–19 season, an NBA Summer League stint with the Dallas Mavericks led to Creek spending preseason with the Brooklyn Nets. He subsequently joined the Long Island Nets of the NBA G League. On 25 January 2019, he signed a 10-day contract with Brooklyn. He made his NBA debut later that day, entering the game against the New York Knicks to take free throws for an injured Rondae Hollis-Jefferson in the fourth quarter, making one of them. He signed a second 10-day contract on 4 February, but was waived on 7 February. During his time with Brooklyn, he was assigned to Long Island four times. Upon being waived, he re-joined Long Island permanently.

On 30 March, Creek signed a 10-day contract with the Minnesota Timberwolves. On 9 April, he signed with the Timberwolves for the rest of the season. In July 2019, he played for the Timberwolves at the Las Vegas Summer League.

South East Melbourne Phoenix (2019–present)
In 2019, Creek returned to Australia and joined the South East Melbourne Phoenix for their debut season in the NBL.

Creek scored an NBL career-high 32 points in a game against the Cairns Taipans on 26 January 2020. On 6 February 2020, Creek was fined $500 by the NBL for comments he made to Adelaide 36ers owner Grant Kelley following the Phoenix's game against Adelaide on 2 February. He missed the last two games of the season after hyperextending his knee against the Sydney Kings on 9 February.

On 15 March 2021, the NBL announced that Creek would not play or train with the Phoenix indefinitely after he received charges stemming from alleged assault offences. He was reinstated by the NBL on 30 March but was relinquished of his team captaincy and not allowed to participate in community activities with the Phoenix. All charges were dropped on 21 April. He helped the Phoenix reach the finals in 2020–21. During the 2021 off-season, he played for the South West Metro Pirates in the NBL1 North.

On 10 December 2021, Creek scored a career-high 36 points in a 95–88 win over the New Zealand Breakers. Following the 2021–22 NBL season, he had a stint in Puerto Rico with Mets de Guaynabo of the Baloncesto Superior Nacional.

On 18 May 2022, Creek re-signed with the Phoenix on a three-year deal. In November 2022, he played his 300th NBL game. On 18 December 2022, he scored 46 points in a 113–112 double-overtime win over the Sydney Kings. Following the 2022–23 NBL season, he returned to Mets de Guaynabo.

Career statistics

NBA

Regular season

|-
| style="text-align:left;"| 
| style="text-align:left;"| Brooklyn
| 4 || 0 || 9.0 || .500 || .000 || .714 || 2.5 || 1.3 || .3 || .0 || 3.8
|-
| style="text-align:left;"| 
| style="text-align:left;"| Minnesota
| 1 || 0 || 12.0 || .500 || .000 || --- || 2.0 || 1.0 || 1.0 || .0 || 6.0
|- class="sortbottom"
| style="text-align:center;" colspan="2"| Career
| 5 || 0 || 9.6 || .500 || .000 || .714 || 2.4 || 1.2 || .4 || .0 || 4.2

National team career
Creek first competed for Australia in 2011 at the FIBA Under-19 World Championship. In August 2017, he represented the Australian Boomers for the first time at the FIBA Asia Cup. He later played for Australia during the 2019 FIBA World Cup qualifiers. In February 2021, Creek was named in the Boomers' Olympic squad.

Personal life
Off the court, Creek is a qualified personal trainer.

References

External links

Mitch Creek at adelaide36ers.com
Mitch Creek at fiba.com
"Take 40: Mitch Creek" at nbl.com.au
"From Horsham to the Big Apple, Mitch Creek heads to Brooklyn" at smh.com.au

1992 births
Living people
Adelaide 36ers players
Australian expatriate basketball people in Germany
Australian expatriate basketball people in the United States
Australian Institute of Sport basketball players
Australian men's basketball players
BG Göttingen players
Brooklyn Nets players
Long Island Nets players
Minnesota Timberwolves players
National Basketball Association players from Australia
People from Horsham, Victoria
Shooting guards
Small forwards
South East Melbourne Phoenix players
Sportsmen from Victoria (Australia)
Undrafted National Basketball Association players
2019 FIBA Basketball World Cup players